Viktor Kompaniyets (born 21 March 1937) is a Ukrainian former athlete. He competed in the men's discus throw at the 1960 Summer Olympics and the 1964 Summer Olympics, representing the Soviet Union.

References

1937 births
Living people
Athletes (track and field) at the 1960 Summer Olympics
Athletes (track and field) at the 1964 Summer Olympics
Ukrainian male discus throwers
Olympic athletes of the Soviet Union
Place of birth missing (living people)
Soviet male discus throwers